Miswar Saputra (born 19 April 1996) is an Indonesian professional footballer who plays as a goalkeeper for Liga 1 club Madura United.

Career statistics

Club

Honours

Club 
Persebaya Surabaya
 Liga 2: 2017
 Liga 1 runner-up: 2019
 Indonesia President's Cup runner-up: 2019
PSS Sleman

 Menpora Cup third place: 2021

References

External links 
 Miswar Saputra at Soccerway
 Miswar Saputra at Liga Indonesia

1992 births
Living people
Indonesian footballers
Sportspeople from Aceh
PSSB Bireuen players
Persiraja Banda Aceh players
Persebaya Surabaya players
PSM Makassar players
PSS Sleman players
Madura United F.C. players
Liga 1 (Indonesia) players
Liga 2 (Indonesia) players
Association football goalkeepers